On reading as true travel (original title: De la lecture comme seul voyage) is an essay written in French by the French Nobel laureate, J. M. G. Le Clézio.

Translated from the French
It was translated from French into English by Julia Abramson, assistant professor of French at the Department of Modern Languages, Literatures, and Linguistics at the University of Oklahoma, as "On reading as true travel" and published in English in 2002.

British Library Serials
Published by British Library Serials(Shelfmark:	9356.558600)
Can be read online at wheretostay.tips  Digital document as download from Essential Books

Publication history
"Sur la lecture comme le vrai voyage" was written in French. The original title of the essay could be supposed to have been De la lecture comme seul voyage (no publication sources found).

References

Essays by J. M. G. Le Clézio
French-language literature
Works by J. M. G. Le Clézio